Baldev Mann was a left-wing activist of the Communist Party of India (Marxist–Leninist) New Democracy. He was a state level leader of Kirti Kisan Union and the editor of Hirawal Dasta a revolutionary journal of the Naxalites. On 26 September 1986 he was killed by terrorists while on his way to his village, Bagga Kalan, in Amritsar district of Punjab. Sonia Mann, daughter of martyred comrade Baldev Singh Mann.

Life

Baldev Mann was born on 9 July 1952. He was the son of Inder Singh. He lived in the village Bagga Kalan Tehsil Ajnala, Amritsar. He completed his primary education at the village school he matriculated from government high school at Raja Sansi.  He then went to Khalsa College, Amritsar, where he had to face detention from the college during the time of 'the Emergency', and graduated in 1983.

While at Day College, he came in contact with the Communist Party of India (CPIML-ND). He organized young people in his village under the banner of 'Naujawan Bharat Sabha', a left-wing Indian association that sought to instigate revolution against the British Raj by gathering together workers and peasant youths. He turned it into a district-wide youth moment in Amritsar.

While at Amritsar he was held and tortured at Amritsar's interrogation center, but released in 1975.

Approximately two years before his death, Mann married Paramjit Kaur, with whom he had a daughter. She was one week old when he was murdered while on his way to his village, Chinna Bagga, in Amritsar.

The letter

Baldev Singh Mann was killed while visiting his family. He wrote a letter to his daughter shortly before his death, stating "I am struggling for the birth of a social order in which the shackles that enslave human beings are broken to bits, where the oppressed can heave a sigh of relief".

References

See also
Arjan Singh Mastana
Darshan Singh Canadian
Deepak Dhawan
Jaimal Singh Padda
Nidhan Singh Gudhan
Pash
Teja Singh Swatantar
Punjab insurgency
Communist Party of India (Marxist-Leninist) New Democracy

1952 births
1986 deaths
Punjabi people
Indian Sikhs